The Osich'ŏn Line was a non-electrified railway line of the Korean State Railway in Unhŭng County, Ryanggang Province, North Korea, running from Taeoch'ŏn on the Paektusan Ch'ŏngnyŏn Line to Osich'ŏn.

The branch line to Kim Jong-un's private railway station, called "Hyesan No. 1 Station", diverges from the main line of the Paektusan Ch'ŏngnyŏn Line at almost the same point as the Osich'ŏn Line.

History
This Osich'ŏn Line was opened by the Chosen Government Railway on 1 November 1937, at the same time as the Pongduri−Hyesanjin section of the Kilhye Line.

Route 
A yellow background in the "Distance" box indicates that section of the line is not electrified.

References

Railway lines in North Korea
Standard gauge railways in North Korea